Middlesex South was a federal electoral district that was represented in the House of Commons of Canada from 1883 to 1904. It was located in the province of Ontario. This riding was created from parts of Middlesex East and Middlesex West ridings.

It consisted of the townships of Westminster, Delaware, Caradoc and Lobo.

The electoral district was abolished in 1903 when it was redistributed between Middlesex North, Middlesex East and Middlesex West ridings.

Electoral history

|}

|}

|}

On Mr. Armstrong's death, 26 January 1893:
 

|}

|}

|}

See also 

 List of Canadian federal electoral districts
 Past Canadian electoral districts

External links 
 Parliamentary website

Former federal electoral districts of Ontario